Wilton "Bill" Manhoff (June 25, 1919 – June 19, 1974) was an American screenwriter, producer and playwright. His television series script writing credits included  Sanford and Son, The Partridge Family, All in the Family, Room 222, The Odd Couple, Petticoat Junction, Leave It To Beaver, and The Real McCoys. He also wrote the script for the 1964 Broadway play The Owl and the Pussycat, which Buck Henry used as inspiration for the screenplay for the 1970 film adaptation. Manhoff died just six days before his 55th birthday in Los Angeles, California.

References

External links

1919 births
1974 deaths
American male screenwriters
American television writers
Writers from Newark, New Jersey
American male television writers
American male dramatists and playwrights
20th-century American dramatists and playwrights
20th-century American male writers
Screenwriters from New Jersey
20th-century American screenwriters